The Battle of Chenab was fought between the Durrani Empire and the Sikh Misls of Dal Khalsa in 1764.

Battle 
On 13 January 1764, Ahmad Shah Durrani crossed over Attock river. At that point of time, Sikhs were around Sialkot, Gujrat, Shah-Daula and Sodhra. On hearing his advance, Sikh chiefs, in a tactical move swiftly retreated to Guru Chak (Amritsar), there by giving an impression that they had run away due to impending fear from the Afghan troops. Jassa Singh Ramgarhia, Charat Singh and other Sikh chiefs held consultation at Amritsar. It was resolved to let Ahmad Shah Durrani come and that the Khalsa would give him a fight the moment he crossed Chenab. He was under the impression that the Sikhs were at Guru Chak. Sikhs however, turned back with accelerated pace with all their armaments and dug in themselves along the left bank of Chenab to give a surprise battle to Abdali.

Ahmad Shah halted at Rohtas Fort before crossing the Jhelum. The Sikhs divided their forces into two or three divisions with the idea of giving battle to him. He was on the other side of the Chenab with nearly 40,000 horses and the Sikhs were on this side of the river with more than 100,000 horses and foot. The Shah crossed the river to fight a decisive battle. Among the Sikhs were Charat Singh, Hari Singh (Bhangi), Jassa Singh Ramgarhia, and others. After much slaughter on both sides, the Afghan troops suffered defeat sustaining very heavy losses. Many jumped into Chenab missing the ford. The Shah camp along the right bank was sacked. Shah himself put his horse in the water but his whereabouts were not known. Ahmad Shah Durrani suffered defeat at the hands of the Sikhs who relieved him of a number of horses and property. The Shah reached Jhelum with his troops in total disarray.

References 
1.

Battles involving the Durrani Empire
Battles involving the Sikhs